Irwin Unger (May 2, 1927 - May 21, 2021, New York City) was an American historian and academic specializing in economic history, the history of the 1960s, and the history of the Gilded Age. He earned his Ph.D. from Columbia University in 1958 and is currently Professor Emeritus of History at New York University.

Unger won the Pulitzer Prize for History in 1965 for his book, The Greenback Era. His most recent book, written in collaboration with Stanley Hirshson, a Queens College historian, and Debi Unger, an editor at HarperCollins, is a 2014 biography of George Marshall.

Personal life

Irwin was married to author and journalist Debi Unger; they have collaborated on several books.

Books
Among Unger's published books are:
George Marshall, (with Debi Unger and Stanley Hirshson, 2014)
The Guggenheims: A Family History, (with Debi Unger, 2005)
LBJ : A Life, (with Debi Unger, 1999)
The Times Were a Changin': The Sixties Reader (with Debi Unger, 1998)
The Best of Intentions: The Great Society Programs of Kennedy, Johnson and Nixon (1996)
Turning Point, 1968, (with Debi Unger, 1988)
These United States: The Questions of Our Past (1978)
The Vulnerable Years: The United States, 1896-1917 (1977)
The Movement: The American New Left 1959-1973 (1973)
The Greenback Era (1964)
In addition, Unger has written a number of textbooks on modern American history.

References

External links
Faculty Profile of Irwin Unger, New York University

Living people
1927 births
21st-century American historians
21st-century American male writers
New York University faculty
City College of New York alumni
Columbia University alumni
Pulitzer Prize for History winners
American male non-fiction writers